Manbhumi or Manbhumi Bengali is the local Bengali dialect spoken in the district of Purulia, and adjacent area of other districts of West Bengal and Jharkhand, previously Manbhum, in Eastern India. It is one of the Bengali dialects, having some influences of neighbouring dialects of Odia in it. Manbhumi has a rich tradition of folk songs sung in various occasions. Tusu songs are sung by village girls during a month-long observance of Tusu festival in villages of Purulia and some parts of Barddhaman, Bankura and Birbhum districts of West Bengal and parts of East Singhbhum, Saraikela Kharsawan, Bokaro, Dhanbad and Ranchi districts of Jharkhand. Bhadu songs, Karam songs, Baul songs and Jhumar songs are also composed in Manbhumi. Manbhumi songs are used by Chhau performers of Purulia School to depict various mythological events. Chhau is one of the distinguished dance forms of this geographical region which has been accorded the status of Intangible cultural heritage by UNESCO in 2009.

Regional variation

This Bengali dialect is spoken in the Manbhum area and has its extended regional variants or subdialects throughout southern border area of Medinipur division of West Bengal, south eastern border of Kolhan division of Jharkhand and Mayurbhanj, Kendujhar district and Balasore district of Odisha.

Manbhum: æk loker duţa beţa chhilô. (M)

East Medinipur: gote loker duiţa toka thilo. (M)

Dhalbhum/East Singhbhum: ek loker duţa chha chhilo. (M)

Pashchim Bardhaman district: kono loker duiţi chhele chhilo. (M)

Ranchi: æk loker du beţa rahe. (M)

Baharagora/Gopiballavpur: gotae noker duţa po thailaa. (M)

Mayurbhanj: akţa loker duţa beţa chhilo / rahe. (M)

Manbhum: tumhra kuthay jachho? (M)

East Medinipur: tumra kaai jachho? (M)

Dhalbhum/East Singhbhum: tumhra kaai jachho? (M)

Pashchim Bardhaman district: tumra kuthay jachchho? (M)

Ranchi: tumharman kahan jaatraho? (M)

Baharagora/Gopiballavpur: tumarkar kaai jaoţo ? (M)

Mayurbhanj: tora kahi jachho ? (M)

Manbhum: Chhana ţa bhalo padhchhe (M)

East Medinipur: pila ţa bhala padhţe? (M)

Dhalbhum/East Singhbhum: Chha ţa bhalo padhchhe? (M)

Pashchim Bardhaman district: Chhana ţa bhalo padhchhe (M)

Ranchi: Chhaua ţa bes padhatrahe (M)

Baharagora/Gopiballavpur: Chha ţa bhala padheţe. (M)

Mayurbhanj: Chhana/ Chha ţa bhalo padchhe. (M)

There are two tribal languages, Kharia Thar and Mal Paharia, mainly spoken in Manbhum region of Bengal and Jharkhand by some small tribes, are closely related to Western Bengali dialects, but are typically classified as separate languages.

References

 Bengali language
Bengali dialects
Languages of West Bengal